Rugby union at the 1966 South Pacific Games was played as a round-robin tournament with 4 men's teams competing. No finals were played and the teams finishing in the top three positions were awarded medals. Papua New Guinea, captained by Peter Emery, won the gold medal and were unbeaten in the tournament.

Medal summary

Men's tournament

Standings
Final standings after the round robin tournament:

Matches

See also
Rugby union at the Pacific Games

References

Rugby union
1966
International rugby union competitions hosted by New Caledonia
1966 rugby union tournaments for national teams